Extreme Gamer is an independent videogame website based out of Niagara Falls, Ontario dedicated to reviews, features stories and generalized content on the videogame industry. The site was founded in 2003 by Christian Boutilier ('Downtown Jimmy'), a veteran videogame journalist. Nearly eight years old, Extreme Gamer remains one of the longest running, independent videogame websites in the world.

Extreme Gamer is currently one of a handful of videogame web sites based and intended for Canadian audiences, with nearly two thirds of its readership originating from this country. In particular, the majority of Extreme Gamer readership originates from British Columbia and its physical headquarters of Southern Ontario.

The site, while Canada-based, endorses a global perspective on the industry, and is staffed by writers from across the United States, England, Canada and Australia. According to the site information page, the average industry familiarity of Extreme Gamer voluntary staffers is over fifteen years each.

Originally an Xbox only site, Extreme Gamer now features content on every gaming console. The site recently surpassed its 800th piece of original content, with its reviews factored into overall GameRankings and Metacritic review formulas. Moreover, Extreme Gamer's scoring criteria features a unique ‘Mojo’ component, one subjectively intended to gauge a title's contributions to overall genre plus console offerings to date. As of November 5, 2010, the average score given to games is 76%, which is 3.2% higher than the industry average for the games reviewed. The site is also referenced by other media outlets, game publishers and developers, entertainment companies such as Digital Extremes, Bethesda Softworks, THQ, Bioware, NIS America, Giant Bomb, and WWE.

References

External links
Extreme Gamer

Mass media in Niagara Falls, Ontario
Video game websites
Canadian entertainment websites
Internet properties established in 2003
2003 establishments in Ontario